VTR may refer to:

 Video tape recorder
 Vermont Railway, reporting mark
 View through rate, in online advertising
 VTR Globalcom
 Verilog-to-Routing, an open-source CAD-tool for FPGAs
 Versatile Test Reactor, a sodium cooled fast reactor